KFC Uerdingen 05 is a German football club in the Uerdingen district of the city of Krefeld, North Rhine-Westphalia. The former Bundesliga side enjoyed its greatest successes in the 1980s but now plays in the fifth-level Oberliga.

History
The club was founded on 17 November 1905 as Fußball-Club Uerdingen 05. On 1 August 1919, following World War I, FC was joined by Sportvereinigung des Realgymnasiums Uerdingen. During World War II from 1941 to 1945 the club played as part of the combined wartime side Kriegspiel-Gemeinschaft KSG Uerdingen alongside VfB 1910 Uerdingen (which was known from 1910 to 1919 as Sport-Club Preussen Uerdingen). That partnership continued after the war with the two clubs playing as Spielvereinigung Uerdingen 05. On 20 February 1948, VfB became independent again and in 1950 SpVgg resumed their original identity as FC Uerdingen 05.

In 1953, the club merged with the Werkssportgruppen Bayer AG Uerdingen, the local worker's sports club of the chemical giant Bayer AG, becoming FC Bayer 05 Uerdingen. Bayer withdrew its sponsorship of the football team in 1995 at which time the club took on the name Krefelder Fußball-Club Uerdingen 05. Bayer continues to support the non-footballing departments of the club as Sport-Club Bayer 05 Uerdingen.

Uerdingen played in the amateur local leagues throughout their early history. By the early 1960s they had advanced as far as the Amateurliga Niederrhein (III) where they would play until 1971 when they stepped up into the Regionalliga West (II). The club then enjoyed a succession of strong finishes: a second-place result in 1974–75 earned them promotion to the top flight Bundesliga, where they finished dead last. After three seasons in the second tier 2. Bundesliga Nord, another second-place finish returned Uerdingen to the Bundesliga in 1979, this time for a two-year stay. The club would go on to enjoy its most successful years through the 1980s. They returned to the Bundesliga in 1983 and earned a best-ever third-place result there in 1986. Uerdingen also captured the DFB-Pokal (German Cup) in 1985 with a 2–1 victory over Bundesliga champions Bayern Munich in Berlin's Olympiastadion.

Legendary in the club's history from this time is their victory over Dynamo Dresden in the quarter-finals of the 1986 European Cup Winners Cup. Down 2–0 after the first leg away and behind 3–1 by half-time at home in the return leg, Uerdingen came storming back with six unanswered goals to win 7–3.

In 1987, Uerdingen also became the first club to win both the German under 19's and under 17's championship in the same season.

The team spent the first half of the 1990s as an "elevator crew" bouncing up and down between the Bundesliga and 2. Bundesliga. After the 1995 season Bayer withdrew its sponsorship of the football team which has suffered chronic financial difficulties ever since. Uerdingen took up their final year of play in the Bundesliga in the 1995–96 season as Krefelder Fußball-Club Uerdingen 05. By the turn of the millennium they had slipped through the second division and into third division play. The club's persistent financial problems led the DFB to deny them a license for play in the Regionalliga Nord (III) in 2003 despite a mid-table finish and they were relegated to the Oberliga Nordrhein (IV).

Veteran manager and Fortuna Düsseldorf legend Aleksandar Ristić was put in charge of the team as German football was reorganised with the introduction the new 3. Liga in 2008–09. KFC attempted to qualify for the restructured Regionalliga (IV), but failed in its attempt and was instead relegated to the Verbandsliga (VI) after finishing 13th.

In 2009, KFC has struggled with financial difficulties and its efforts to raise money included auctioning on eBay the right to coach the squad for one match and inviting childhood fan Pete Doherty to a league match.

In 2010–11, the club won the Verbandsliga and thus gained promotion to the NRW-Liga (V). It was the first promotion in 17 years. KFC finished 8th NRW-Liga and missed second consecutive promotion to Regionalliga West due to finishing behind VfB Hüls. After the disbanding of the NRW-Liga, KFC qualified for the Oberliga Niederrhein. It won a league championship at this level in 2013 and was promoted to the Regionalliga West but relegated back to the Oberliga again in 2015.

In 2017, Uerdingen won promotion to Regionalliga West and in 2018 after winning the playoff against Waldhof Mannheim won promotion to 3. Liga.

In January 2021, outgoing president Mikhail Ponomarev and his deputy Nicolas Weinhardt announced their departure from the club and shortly after, stated that due to financial losses caused mainly by the impact of the COVID-19 pandemic on association football and an unclear situation regarding the stadium in Krefeld, it had filed for insolvency. On 10 February 2021 the club was bought by Armenian business man and owner of the Noah Company, Roman Gevorkyan, who was also the owner of Armenian FC Noah, Latvian FC Noah Jūrmala and Italian A.C.N. Siena 1904.

In June 2021, due to financial insolvency, and the inability to meet the licensing requirements of the 3. Liga, KFC Uerdingen was relegated to the Regionalliga West. This led to Gevorkyan and the Noah Company withdrawing their engagements in the club, and all players were released by the club. In the 2021–22 season, Uerdingen suffered a second consecutive relegation, and were relegated to the Oberliga.

Current squad

Honours

Senior
 DFB-Pokal
Winners: 1984–85
 European Cup Winners' Cup
 Semi-finalists: 1985–86
 Oberliga Niederrhein
Winners: 2012–13
 Verbandsliga Niederrhein
Winners: 2010–11
 Lower Rhine Cup
Winners: 2000–01, 2018–19

Youth
 German Under 19 championship
Winners: 1986–87
 German Under 17 championship
Winners: 1986–87

Recent seasons

Managerial history
 7 January 1970 – 30 June 1977 Klaus Quinkert
 7 January 1977 – 30 June 1979 Siegfried Melzig
 7 January 1979 – 30 June 1981 Horst Buhtz
 7 January 1981 – 30 June 1983 Werner Biskup
 7 January 1983 – 30 June 1984 Friedhelm Konietzka
 7 January 1984 – 30 June 1987 Karl-Heinz Feldkamp
 7 January 1987 – 12 January 1987 Horst Köppel
 12 August 1987 – 30 June 1989 Rolf Schafstall
 7 January 1989 – 25 November 1990 Horst Wohlers
 26 November 1990 – 6 February 1991 Friedhelm Konietzka
 6 March 1991 – 13 May 1996 Friedhelm Funkel
 14 May 1996 – 30 June 1996 Armin Reutershahn
 7 January 1996 – 30 June 1997 Hans-Ulrich Thomale
 7 January 1997 – 29 September 1998 Jürgen Gelsdorf
 30 September 1998 – 28 March 1999 Henk ten Cate
 28 March 1999 – 30 June 1999 Ernst Middendorp
 7 January 1999 – 31 October 1999 Herbert Schäty
 11 January 1999 – 30 June 2000 Peter Vollmann
 7 January 2000 – 30 June 2002 Jos Luhukay
 7 January 2002 – 13 May 2004 Claus-Dieter Wollitz
 7 January 2004 – 30 June 2006 Wolfgang Maes
 7 January 2006 – 30 June 2007 Jürgen Luginger
 7 January 2007 – 22 March 2008 Aleksandar Ristić
 24 March 2008 – 30 June 2008 Klaus Berge
 7 January 2008 – 8 November 2008 Richard Towa
 8 November 2008 – 18 September 2009 Uwe Weidemann
 18 September 2009 – 30 March 2010 Wolfgang Maes
 31 March 2010 – 17 May 2010 Edgar Schmitt
 10 June 2010 – 5 November 2011 Peter Wongrowitz
 15 November 2011 – 24 May 2012 Jörg Jung
 26 May 2012 – 31 June 2012 Erhan Albayrak & Ronny Kockel
 1 July 2012 – 28 March 2014 Eric van der Luer
 28 March 2014 – 14 April 2014 Erhan Albayrak
 14 April 2014 – 22 April 2014 Ersan Tekkan
 22 April 2014 – 18 May 2015 Murat Salar
 18 May 2015 – 23 June 2015 Horst Riege
 23 June 2015 – 2 March 2016 Michael Boris
 2 March 2016 – 21 March 2016 Gerd Gotsche & Horst Riege
 21 March 2016 – 20 May 2016 Jörn Großkopf
 20 May 2016 – 30 May 2017 André Pawlak
 1 July 2017 – 15 March 2018 Michael Wiesinger
 15 March 2018 – 28 January 2019 Stefan Krämer
 31 January 2019 – 3 February 2019 Stefan Reisinger
 3 February 2019 – 15 March 2019 Norbert Meier
 16 March 2019 – 30 April 2019 Frank Heinemann
 30 April 2019 – 25 September 2019 Heiko Vogel
 25 September 2019 – 16 October 2019 Stefan Reisinger
 16 October 2019 – 10 March 2020 Daniel Steuernagel
 10 March 2020 – 13 April 2021 Stefan Krämer
 13 April 2021 – 30 June 2021 Jürgen Press & Stefan Reisinger
 1 August 2021 – 2 November 2021 Dmitri Voronov
 8 November 2021 – 28 November 2022 Alexander Voigt
 9 December 2022 – present Björn Joppe

References

External links
 

 
Football clubs in Germany
Football clubs in North Rhine-Westphalia
Association football clubs established in 1905
1905 establishments in Germany
Sport in Krefeld
Bayer
Bundesliga clubs
2. Bundesliga clubs
3. Liga clubs